Steven James Biggins (born 20 June 1954) is an English former footballer. A forward, he scored 66 goals in 237 league games in a fifteen-year career in the Football League.

Starting at Hednesford Town, he signed to Shrewsbury Town for £6,000 in December 1977, and helped the "Shrews" to the Third Division title in 1978–79, and also featured in Welsh Cup finals in 1979 and 1980. Transferring to Oxford United for £8,000 in July 1982, he helped the club to the Third Division title in 1983–84 and the Second Division title in 1984–85. He moved on to Derby County in October 1984. He had brief loan spells with Wolverhampton Wanderers and Port Vale, as both Derby and Port Vale won promotion in 1985–86. He spent a brief period playing in Sweden for Trelleborg, before returning to England to play for Exeter City and non-league sides Telford United and Worcester City.

Career
Biggins was a pupil at the Shire Oak Grammar School (now Shire Oak Academy) in Walsall Wood, West Midlands. He began his career at non-league Hednesford Town before being signed by Third Division side Shrewsbury Town for £6,000 in December 1977. The Gay Meadow club went on to finish the 1977–78 campaign in 11th place. New manager Graham Turner then led the "Shrews" to the Welsh Cup and the Third Division title in 1978–79, they had though finished just two points ahead of fourth placed Gillingham. They retained their Second Division status in 1979–80 with a comfortable mid-table finish. They also competed in the final of Welsh Cup, losing 5–1 to Newport County. Shrewsbury dropped to 14th in 1980–81, just three points above the relegation zone. They dropped to 18th in 1981–82, two places and two points above the drop.

He was sold to Third Division club Oxford United for £8,000 in July 1982. The "Yellows" finished fifth in 1982–83, two places and two points short of promotion. Biggins was their leading goalscorer with 24 goals in all competitions in 1983–84, as manager Jim Smith led Oxford to the Third Division title. However, Biggins soon moved on again, joining Derby County in October 1984; Oxford would go on to finish top of the Second Division. Despite moving back down to the third tier, the striker was unable to hold down a place under Arthur Cox at the Baseball Ground. The "Rams" finished seventh in 1984–85, and Biggins also had a brief spell on loan at Wolverhampton Wanderers. Derby won promotion in third place in 1985–86, though he spent a four-game period on loan at Port Vale, who John Rudge led to promotion out of the Fourth Division that season.

He had a short spell with Trelleborg in Sweden, before returning to England to sign with Exeter City in October 1986. He played 14 Fourth Division games for the "Grecians" in 1986–87, playing his last game in the Football League in January. He moved on to Telford United, scoring 20 goals for the Conference side in 1987–88. He later played for non-league side Worcester City and Ludlow Town. He later served as assistant manager of Ellesmere Rangers.

Career statistics
Source:

Honours
Shrewsbury Town
Football League Third Division: 1978–79
Welsh Cup: 1979; runner-up: 1980

Oxford United
Football League Third Division:  1983–84
Football League Second Division:  1984–85

Derby County
Football League Third Division third-place promotion: 1985–86

Port Vale
Football League Fourth Division fourth-place promotion: 1985–86

References

1954 births
Living people
Sportspeople from Lichfield
English footballers
Association football forwards
Hednesford Town F.C. players
Shrewsbury Town F.C. players
Oxford United F.C. players
Derby County F.C. players
Wolverhampton Wanderers F.C. players
Port Vale F.C. players
English expatriate footballers
Expatriate footballers in Sweden
Trelleborgs FF players
Exeter City F.C. players
Telford United F.C. players
Worcester City F.C. players
English Football League players
National League (English football) players